Piney Township is a township in Texas County, in the U.S. state of Missouri.

Piney Township was erected in 1845, taking its name from the Big Piney River.

References

Townships in Missouri
Townships in Texas County, Missouri